The Battle of Uttismalm took place on June 28, 1789 during Gustav III's Russian War, Sweden won over the Russian Empire.

The Swedish troops were under the personal command of the king, Gustav III, and numbered about 2,500 men. The Russian troops were of equal size. The battle ended with a Swedish victory and the russians lost around 100 dead and 300 wounded in the battle. The Swedes lost 14 dead and 88 men wounded.

References

Krigshandlingar, 1788-90. (KrA; Krigsarkivet)
Krigshandlingar, 1788-90. (RA; Riksarkivet) Rein: "Finska Armén..."

Uttismalm
1789 in Europe
Uttismalm
Uttismalm
Uttismalm
History of Kymenlaakso